La Doña, is an American telenovela produced by Telemundo. It is based on the Venezuelan novel Doña Bárbara created by Rómulo Gallegos. It stars Aracely Arámbula as the titular character.

Series overview

Episodes

Season 1 (2016–17)

Season 2 (2020)

Specials

La Doña, edición especial (2019–20) 
On 20 December 2019, Telemundo announced the premiere of the first season, now in a limited edition of a few episodes, which will air throughout December until the premiere of the second season on 13 January 2020.

Notes

References

Lists of American drama television series episodes